Federation architecture is the architectural style in Australia that was prevalent from around 1890 to 1915. The name refers to the Federation of Australia on 1 January 1901, when the Australian colonies collectively became the Commonwealth of Australia.

The architectural style had antecedents in the Queen Anne style and Edwardian style of the United Kingdom, combined with various other influences like the Arts and Crafts style. Other styles also developed, like the Federation Warehouse style, which was heavily influenced by the Romanesque Revival style. In Australia, Federation architecture is generally associated with cottages in the Queen Anne style, but some consider that there were twelve main styles that characterized the Federation period.

Definition and features
The Federation period overlaps the Edwardian period, which was so named after the reign of King Edward VII (1901–1910); however, as the style preceded and extended beyond Edward's reign, the term "Federation architecture" was coined in 1969.

Federation architecture has many similarities to Edwardian Baroque architecture; however, there are significant differences that distinguish the Federation architecture style from the Edwardian Baroque architecture style, particularly due to the embracing of Australiana themes and the use of the verandah in domestic settings. Australian flora and fauna are prominently featured, and stylised images of the New South Wales waratah, flannel flower, Queensland firewheel tree, and other flowers, and the kangaroo, kookaburra, and lyrebird, were common. The Coat of Arms, and rising sun, representing a new dawn in the country of Australia, also appeared regularly on gables.

Many Federation buildings, both residential and non-residential, are listed on the Register of the National Estate because of their heritage values.

Gardens and garden architecture
Gardens of the period were complex and contained many elements—generally a wider variety of plants than is seen in contemporary plantings, pergolas, rose arches, gazebos and summerhouses. Wooden lattice fences were used to partition parts of the garden off, particularly the front from the more private back. Garden paths could be straight or gently curved, and often edged with glazed edging tiles or bricks, and made of tiles, packed gravel or bricks. patterns for brick paving include stretcher bond, herringbone and basketweave. Asphalt and concrete were not used.

Plants were selected to produce year-round colour and interest in the local climate conditions. Initially, evergreen trees were used, but the denseness of shade led to increasing popularity of deciduous trees such as Jacaranda, flowering plum and peppercorn. Palms often framed the garden vista, and the native Cootamundra wattle was popular, as were shrubs such as camellias and standard roses. Conservatories contained begonias and Adiantum ferns.

Styles
There are twelve styles that predominated in the Federation period:
 Federation Academic Classical
 Federation Free Classical
 Federation Filigree
 Federation Anglo-Dutch
 Federation Romanesque
 Federation Gothic
 Federation Carpenter Gothic
 Federation Warehouse
 Federation Queen Anne
 Federation Free Style
 Federation Arts and Crafts
 Federation Bungalow

Residential architecture
Of the twelve Federation styles, there are four that were mainly used in residential architecture. They are Federation Queen Anne style, Federation Filigree style, Federation Arts and Craft style, and Federation Bungalow style.

Federation Queen Anne
The Federation Queen Anne style was designed to embrace the outdoor lifestyles of the Australian people. Most homes have asymmetric gables, white-painted window frames, front verandas with decorative timber features, tiling on the patio floor and entry paths. The brickwork is usually a deep red or dark brown, often with a mix of the two. The roofs are typically terracotta tiles with decorative gables (sometimes adorned with finials), motifs, timber features, tall chimneys and fretwork. Decorative leadlight windows are also common, as are circular windows (known as bulls-eye windows). Federation homes also have decorative internal features in the plasterwork, high ceilings and timber features.

Some outstanding examples are West Maling, Penshurst Avenue, Penshurst, New South Wales; Turramurra Ingleholme, Boomerang Street, Turramurra, New South Wales (former home of architect John Sulman); and Caerleon, Bellevue Hill, the first Queen Anne home in Australia. The Federation Queen Anne style was the most popular residential style in Australia between 1890 and 1910.

Federation Filigree
The Federation Filigree style is common in the hotter parts of Australia, especially in the north, since it is designed to create shade while allowing for the free flow of air. It is a common sight in Queensland and is sometimes known as the Queensland style. Some outstanding examples are Belltrees House, Scone, New South Wales; private home, Roderick Street, Ipswich, Queensland; and terrace of homes, east side of High Street, Millers Point, New South Wales.

Federation Arts and Crafts
The Federation Arts and Crafts style had its origins in England, where architects were reacting to the impersonal nature of the Industrial Revolution. Crafts and handiwork were emphasised to give architecture the "human touch". These influences were absorbed into Federation Australia, where the resulting buildings were generally small-scale to medium-scale and predominantly residential. Outstanding examples are Glyn, Kooyong road, Toorak, Victoria; The Crossways, Martin Road, Centennial Park, New South Wales; and Erica, Appian Way, Burwood, New South Wales.

Federation Bungalow
The Federation Bungalow style was the Australian response to the bungalow style that was developed in America by people like Gustav Stickley. It can be seen as a transition phase between the Federation Queen Anne style and the California Bungalow style that took on later. Stylistically, it exploited the qualities of the bungalow while frequently retaining the flair and idiosyncrasies of the Queen Anne style, although usually in simplified form. Outstanding examples are Nee Morna, Nepean Highway, Sorrento, Victoria; Blythewood, Beecroft Road, Cheltenham New South Wales; and The Eyrie, Fox Valley Road, Wahroonga, New South Wales.

Federation Revival
During the early-1990s, many of the design elements that characterised the Federation architecture of old were popularised in mainstream architecture. This Federation revival form is also known as "mock Federation" or "faux Federation". The style was widespread within the realm of residential housing (especially in new development suburbs) and for apartment buildings; however, smaller shopping centres and other public buildings also made use of the revival style that retained widespread popularity until the early 2000s. Suburbs of Sydney that developed in the 1990s—such as Cherrybrook, Castle Hill, and Menai—are notable in the sense that large tracts of these developments contain almost exclusively Federation revival homes.

The construction of Federation revival architecture varied little from that of other basic styles, with the Federation elements merely forming the facade and decorating elements of the building. For example, the typical brick and roof tile construction, hexagonal turrets, ornate gable work, finials, prominent verandah, steep pitched roofs, and faceted bay windows served to parallel the traditional Federation architecture.

Non-residential architecture
Federation non-residential buildings can be in any of the twelve styles. The following gallery shows some examples of non-residential buildings.

Federation architects
Notable Federation architects in Australia include:

 Rodney Alsop
 Harold Desbrowe Annear
 Albert Edmund Bates (Rockhampton, Queensland)
 Hillson Beasley
 A. L. Buchanan
 Henry Budden CBE
 Walter Butler
 Hugh Hamilton Campbell (Warwick, Queensland)
 Claude William Chambers (Qld)
 John James Clark
 Robin Dods
 George Thomas Eaton (Rockhampton, Queensland)
 Richard Gailey (Brisbane, Queensland)
 George Brockwell Gill (Ipswich, Queensland)
 Carlyle Greenwell
 William Hodgen (Toowoomba, Queensland)
 Sir Talbot Hobbs
 John Horbury Hunt
 Edward Jeaffreson Jackson (Sydney to 1908)
 Howard Joseland
 George Sydney Jones
 Henry Hardie Kemp
 Harry Marks (Toowoomba)
 George McRae
 Thomas Pollard Sampson
 Sir John Sulman
 George Temple-Poole
 Beverley Ussher
 Walter Liberty Vernon
 B. J. Waterhouse

See also

 Australian architectural styles
 Australian residential architectural styles
 Australian non-residential architectural styles
 Appian Way, Burwood
 List of Australian historic homesteads

References

Notes

Bibliography
 Archi Centre - The Federation House
 Australian Heritage Architecture
 The Heritage of Australia, Macmillan Company, 1981

External links

 Federation Architecture at Flickr
 Gallery of Federation Architecture
 Gallery of Sydney Architecture
 Federation House

 
Architectural styles
Australian architectural history

Edwardian architecture
Australia
Housing in Australia